Justin Woodson is an American politician and a Democratic member of the Hawaii House of Representatives since January 15, 2013 representing District 9, which includes Kahului, Puʻunene, Old Sand Hills, and Maui Lani.  Woodson currently serves as Chairperson on the Committee of Higher and Lower Education, a member of the Housing and Transportation Committee, and serves as the Majority Whip for the House.  Woodson previously served as a member on the Intrastate, Tourism, Veterans, Military, International Affairs, Culture and Arts Committees.

Woodson helped initiate the Hawaiʻi Promise Program, Hawaiʻi's version of free college within the community college system for in-state students that demonstrate financial need.  Woodson has publicly expressed his interest in expanding the Hawaiʻi Promise Program to all University of Hawaiʻi schools and is a strong advocate for world class K-12 public education in the state of Hawaiʻi and across the United States.  He is also a proponent of early education and has worked to help build out a high quality public pre-kindergarten system in Hawaiʻi.

Personal life 

 Woodson and his wife, Stacy Suyat Woodson, have four children.

Education 

Woodson earned his BA in political science from California State University Fullerton.

Elections
Woodson was appointed by Hawaii Governor Neil Abercrombie to fill the vacancy left by current Hawaii State Senator Gilbert S.C. Keith-Agaran
In 2014, Woodson defeated James "Kimo" Apana to the Hawaii House of Representative.
In 2016, Woodson won re-election to the Hawaii House of Representatives.
In 2018, Woodson defeated Kauanoe Batangan in the Democratic primary for the Hawaii House of Representatives District 9 on August 11, 2018.

References

External links
Official page at the Hawaii State Legislature
 

Place of birth missing (living people)
Year of birth missing (living people)
Living people
Democratic Party members of the Hawaii House of Representatives
21st-century American politicians